Agricultural law, sometimes referred to as Ag Law, deals with such legal issues as agricultural infrastructure, seed, water, fertilizer, pesticide use, agricultural finance, agricultural labour, agricultural marketing, agricultural insurance, farming rights, land tenure and tenancy system and law on Agricultural processing and rural industry. With implementation of modern technologies, issues including credit, intellectual property, trade and commerce related to agricultural products are dealt within the sphere of this law.

Simply put, agricultural law is the study of the special laws and regulations that apply to the production and sale of agricultural products. "Agricultural exceptionalism," i.e., the use of legal exceptions to protect the agricultural industry, is pervasive, worldwide.  American law schools and legal scholars first recognized agricultural law as a discipline in the 1940s when law schools at Yale, Harvard, Texas, and Iowa explored and initiated agricultural law courses. These early efforts were short-lived, however, and agricultural law as a distinct discipline did not resurface for three decades.  In 1979, a scholarly journal, The Agricultural Law Journal was initiated. In 1980, the American Agricultural Law Association was formed and an advanced law degree program, the LL.M. Program in Agricultural Law was founded at the University of Arkansas School of Law. In 1981, a fifteen volume Agricultural Law Treatise was published and in 1985, the first law school casebook, Agricultural Law: Cases and Materials was published by West Publishing.

In recent years, agricultural law studies have expanded to incorporate a wider consideration of the impact of agricultural production, including issues of environmental law, sustainability, animal welfare, and food law and policy. Reflecting this expanded perspective, in 2009, the LL.M. Program in Agricultural Law at Arkansas changed its name to the LL.M Program in Agricultural and Food Law.  In 2010, the second law school textbook was published with the title, Food, Farming & Sustainability: Readings in Agricultural Law. And, in 2012, the American Association of Law Schools changed the name of its Agricultural Law section to Agricultural and Food Law. The emerging discipline of food law & policy traces its roots to the discipline of agricultural law as well as tradition food and drug law.

See also 
Adjusted Gross Revenue Insurance
Agricultural Act of 1949
Agricultural Act of 1954
Agricultural district
National Agricultural Law Center
American Agricultural Law Association

References

External links
Iowa State University's Center for Agricultural Law and Taxation
LL.M. Program in Agricultural & Food Law, University of Arkansas School of Law
Food Farming & Sustainability: Legal Resources Website
Drake Agricultural Law Center
Agricultural Law Information Partnership
LLM in Food and Agriculture Law, Vermont Law and Graduate School